General Statutes may refer to:

Terms 
 Statutes at Large
 Organic statute
 Statutes

Governments codes
 Connecticut General Statutes
 North Carolina General Statutes
 Basic Statute of Oman

See also
 Statutory law
 Statute book